is a lighthouse on the island of Tsurushima, which is administered by Matsuyama, Ehime, Japan.

History
This lighthouse was one of those designed by Richard Henry Brunton, who worked for the government of Japan in the Meiji period to help them construct lighthouses to allow foreign ships to come to Japan safely.  It was first lit on June 15, 1873.

See also

 List of lighthouses in Japan

Notes

Lighthouses completed in 1873
Lighthouses in Japan
Buildings and structures in Ehime Prefecture
1873 establishments in Japan
Matsuyama, Ehime